Mark Truscott (born 1970) is a Toronto poet. He was born in Bloomington, Indiana, United States.  He attended several public schools and Nelson High School in Burlington, Ontario and went on for a B.A. and M.A. in English at McMaster University in Hamilton.

His first collection, Said Like Reeds or Things (Coach House Books, 2004), was shortlisted for a ReLit Award and received an Alcuin Society Book Design Awards citation for Darren Wershler-Henry’s design. His third collection, Branches, won the inaugural Nelson Ball Prize. Poems appear in the anthologies Shift & Switch: New Canadian Poetry (Mercury Press, 2005) and Pissing Ice: An Anthology of 'New' Canadian Poets (BookThug, 2004). He co-edited the small magazine BafterC with Jay MillAr and curated the Test Reading Series.

Poems online 
 "Colour" (via The Walrus)
 from Branches (via the Cultural Society)

Bibliography 

 Said Like Reeds or Things (Coach House Books, 2004)
 Nature (Book*hug, 2010)
 Branches (Book*hug, 2018)

References

External links
The Toronto Star > review of Branches > November 19, 2018

Writers from Toronto
1970 births
Living people
21st-century Canadian poets
Chapbook writers
Canadian male poets
21st-century Canadian male writers